Gellis is a surname. It may refer to:

Roberta Gellis (1927–2016), American writer of historical fiction, historical romance and fantasy
Sandy Gellis (born 1940), American artist known for her artworks that depict and interpret the natural environment
Isaac Gellis (1849–1906), one of the founders of the Eldridge Street Synagogue and the “kosher sausage king of America”

See also
Gelli (disambiguation)